The 1983 Winston Kings season was the first season of the franchise in the Philippine Basketball Association (PBA). Known as Manhattan Shirtmakers in the All-Filipino Conference and Sunkist Juice Lovers in the Reinforced Conference.

Summary
The Sanyu Group of Companies, the league's newest member who took over from the defunct U-Tex Wranglers, carried its product line Manhattan Shirts of New York and were called Manhattan Shirtmakers with the Hong Kong-based Manhattan Far East subsidizing the team's training expenses. Its line-up were composed of 10 veterans and two rookies and will be handled by coach Nic Jorge. The team did not qualify in the semifinal round of the All-Filipino Conference, placing seventh in their inaugural tournament. 

The team was renamed Sunkist Juice Lovers in the Second Conference. Coach Nic Jorge was replaced by former U-Tex import Glenn McDonald, who saw action for two games before resuming to full-time coaching. McDonald he gave his spot to one-time CDCP import Ronald McCoy, who only played one game and was replaced by Maurice Williams, a seventh-round draft pick by the Los Angeles Lakers. The Juice Lovers were tied with San Miguel with six wins and eight losses after the eliminations. They lost to the Beermen in a playoff game for the last quarterfinals berth.

Fortune Tobacco Corporation took over from the Sanyu Group in the Open Conference and carried the name Winston Kings, now coached by basketball great Lauro Mumar. The Kings started out with the returning Darryl Smith, who played for Great Taste back in 1979, and Eddie Roberson as their imports. After two games, both were replaced by former Gilbey's Gin import Larry McNeill and Maurice Williams, who was called back after playing 12 games with Sunkist in the previous conference. Winston ended up last with five wins and nine losses with one of their victories best remembered for the scoring record made by Larry McNeill, hitting 88 points against Great Taste.

Scoring record
October 25: Larry McNeill set an all-time high for most points in the game by scoring 88 points in Winston' 167-163 overtime victory over Great Taste. The 88-point total output broke the previous record of 85 made by Lew Massey of Gilbey's a year before.

Won-loss records vs Opponents

Roster

All-Filipino & Reinforced Conference

Open Conference

 Team Manager: Pablito Bermundo

References

External links
McNeill's perfect night remembered@Spin.ph

Winston